Silos is the plural of silo, a farm structure in which fodder or forage is kept.

Silos may also refer to:

 Silos, Norte de Santander, Colombia
 Los Silos, a municipality and town on the island Tenerife, Canary Islands, Spain
 The Silos, Montana, a census-designated place in the United States
 The Silos, an American band
 Silos (album), by Sara Storer (2016)
 Jair Amador Silos (born 1989), Portuguese footballer
 Manuel Silos (1906–1988), Filipino filmmaker